The Military Museum of the Chinese People's Revolution or China People's Revolution Military Museum is a museum located in Haidian District, Beijing, China that displays restored military equipment from the history of the People's Liberation Army, up to and including modern-day machinery.

One of the Ten Great Buildings erected in celebration of the ten-year anniversary of the founding of the People's Republic of China, construction of the museum began in October 1958 and ended in 1960.

Collections
The museum's four floors include ten halls, the largest of which is the Hall of Weapons. The Hall's extensive holdings of antiquated weaponry showcase domestic and foreign weapons, including blades, small arms, artillery, tanks, armored personnel carriers, anti-air weaponry, jet fighters, rockets and rocket launchers, and cruise missiles. Foreign weapons include Soviet tanks purchased or donated during the 1950s and 1960s, Japanese weaponry captured during the Second Sino-Japanese War, American weaponry captured from the Kuomintang during the Chinese Civil War and from UN forces during the Korean War. In addition, the Hall of Weapons displays equipment from China's space program, such as satellites and a two-seat orbital capsule.

With two exceptions, the other halls are largely historical exhibits, combining plaster sculptures, maps, paintings, artifacts, movies, and plaques (in Chinese, with select ones translated into English). The other nine halls include:
The Hall of the Agrarian Revolutionary War: Confrontations between 1927 and 1937 of the Chinese Communist Party and the ruling Kuomintang
The Hall of the War to Resist Japanese Aggression: The 1937-1947 Second Sino-Japanese War
The Hall of the War of Liberation of China: The 1945-1949 period of the Chinese Civil War
The Hall of Ancient Wars: Internal and external wars during the 4,000 years before the Qing dynasty
The Hall of Modern Wars: Internal and external wars between 1940 and 1949
The Hall of National Defense and Army Building: Modern military achievements and developments since 1949
The Hall of the War to Resist US Aggression and Aid Korea: Chinese involvement in the Korean War
The Hall of Presents: Gifts to the Chinese military or state by foreign militaries or states
The Hall of Cheng Yunxian's Sculptural Arts: Plaster reproductions of sculptures of world leaders, historical figures, Chinese Communist Party leaders and scientists by Cheng Yunxian

Gallery

See also

 List of museums in China

References
 http://www.china.org.cn/english/kuaixun/73574.htm

Museums established in 1960
Military and war museums in China
Museums in Beijing
Tank museums
National first-grade museums of China
Buildings and structures in Haidian District
People's Liberation Army General Political Department